Eutrichopidia latinus is a species of moth of the family Noctuidae. It is known from eastern Australia, including Queensland, New South Wales, the Australian Capital Territory, Victoria, South Australia and Tasmania.

The moth is about 45 mm. Adults are black with a broad diagonal band across each forewing. This band may vary from white to yellow to orange. The hindwings have a white margin with black dots and the abdomen is tipped with a tuft of orange hairs.

The larvae feed on Hibbertia obtusifolia and Haloragis teucriodes.

References

Agaristinae
Moths described in 1805